Saud Abdullah Salem Abdulhamid (born 18 July 1999) is a Saudi Arabian footballer who plays as a full-back for Pro League side Al-Hilal. He competed at the 2020 Summer Olympics.

Career statistics

Club

International
Scores and results list Saudi Arabia's goal tally first.

Honours

Club
Al-Hilal
Saudi Professional League: 2021–22

International
Saudi Arabia U20
 AFC U-19 Championship: 2018
Saudi Arabia U23
AFC U-23 Asian Cup: 2022

Individual
 Saudi Professional League Young Player of the Month: October 2020, December 2020

References

External links 
 

1999 births
Living people
Sportspeople from Jeddah
Saudi Arabian footballers
Saudi Arabia youth international footballers
Saudi Arabia international footballers
Association football fullbacks
Saudi Professional League players
Ittihad FC players
Al Hilal SFC players
Olympic footballers of Saudi Arabia
Footballers at the 2020 Summer Olympics
2022 FIFA World Cup players